Caledonia Mountain is  summit located in the Canadian Rockies on the shared border of Alberta and British Columbia in Canada. It is also situated on the shared boundary of Jasper National Park with Mount Robson Provincial Park. It is Alberta's 59th most prominent mountain. It was named in 1926 given its position overlooking the Caledonian Valley (now known as the Yellowhead Pass).

Climate

Based on the Köppen climate classification, Caledonia Mountain is located in a subarctic climate with cold, snowy winters, and mild summers. Precipitation runoff from the mountain drains west into tributaries of the Fraser River, or east into Miette River.

See also
List of peaks on the Alberta–British Columbia border
Mountains of Alberta
Mountains of British Columbia

References

Two-thousanders of Alberta
Two-thousanders of British Columbia
Canadian Rockies